The Twin Cities Army Ammunition Plant was a United States Army ammunition plant located in Ramsey County, Minnesota in the current boundaries of the suburbs of Arden Hills and New Brighton, bounded by County Road I to the north, I-35W to the west, U.S. Route 10 to the southwest, County Highway 96 to the south, and Lexington Avenue to the east. The site had 255 buildings across . Current land redevelopment involves the removal of these buildings.

The site was added to the National Priorities List as a Superfund site on September 8, 1983. The soil, sediments, groundwater, and surface water surrounding the plant were contaminated with base neutral acids, metals, polycyclic aromatic hydrocarbons, polychlorinated biphenyls, volatile organic compounds, pesticides, cyanide, and explosives. These contaminants entered Rice Creek and from there the ground water in New Brighton.

Initially, the plant was known as the Twin Cities Ordnance Plant but it was renamed the Twin Cities Arsenal in 1946 and finally, in 1963, the Twin Cities Army Ammunition Plant.

History

The TCAAP was a product of the government-owned, contractor-operated (GOCO) war materials production program established by the War Department during World War II. The Minneapolis-Saint Paul area emerged as a potential GOCO candidate primarily on the basis of labor supply. TCAAP was one of six GOCO plants built to produce small arms ammunition during World War II, and was operated by the Federal Cartridge Corporation under contract to the War Department.

Future of Site
After a bid to make TCAAP the new home for the Minnesota Vikings failed, the Ramsey County Board of Commissioners approved the purchase of the surplus acreage that remains on the original 2,700 acre TCAAP site.  This 427-acre parcel will be redeveloped in conjunction with the City of Arden Hills.  Under terms of the deal, the county will pay the federal government $4.9 million for the property and agree to spend $22.6 million to clean up remaining pollution. In April 2013, the County executed a competitively bid contract with Carl Bolander & Sons of St. Paul for the demolition of all structures on site, and the full remediation of the site to residential soil values  As of October 2013, Bolander and Sons had removed all of the above grade buildings but one, and had begun soil remediation activities.  The county will finance the deal with $21.4 million in bonding, a $6 million transfer from its solid waste fund and $2 million in contingency funds.  These dollars will be replenished through the sale of land for redevelopment.

Joint Development Authority
Through a Joint Powers Agreement (JPA), the City of Arden Hills and Ramsey County have created a Joint Development Authority (JDA).  This entity will be responsible for implementing the City and County approved Master Plan for the site, issuing Requests for Proposals (RFPs), and negotiating development agreements with private developers.  The JDA meets monthly, on the first Monday of the month, at Arden Hills City Hall at 5:30 p.m.

Source of drinking water contamination
In 1987 the TCAAP was positively identified as the source of Volatile organic compound (VOCs) contamination in New Brighton's water supply, first identified in July 1981. The contamination consisted of Trichloroethylene (TCE) at levels ranging from a few parts per billion to over two hundred parts per billion.

See also
List of Superfund sites in Minnesota

References

External links

TCAAP-Restoration Advisory Board
Twin Cities Army Ammunition Plant Files
Redevelopment Project Website

Superfund sites in Minnesota
Military Superfund sites
Historic American Engineering Record in Minnesota
Buildings and structures in Ramsey County, Minnesota
Alliant Techsystems